Pharao is a German Eurodance act produced by Alexander Hawking and DJ Stevie Steve. The band was fronted by Egyptian-Indian singer Kyra Pharao (Claudia Banerjee) (born 17 January 1971) and the American rapper Deon Blue (born 20 January 1970). Pharao released two studio albums,  Pharao (1994) and The Return (1998).

Musical career

Their debut single "I Show You Secrets" reached #6 on the German single Media Control Charts within weeks of its release eventually earning them a gold disc. The single also charted in other European countries including Switzerland and Austria. Their second single "There Is a Star" was another hit reaching #8 in the German official singles chart, which earned them another gold disc. "There is a Star" was also successful in countries such as Switzerland and Sweden, and peaked at #43 in the UK Singles Chart. Their debut album, Pharao, reached #23 on the German album chart. Their third single "World of Magic" was not quite as successful as the first two singles; however, it entered the Top 30 both in Germany and Sweden.

In 1997, after almost two years of silence, they released their second album, albeit without Deon Blue, who by then had left the band.

The first single "Temple of Love" from that album peaked at #36 on the German singles chart, and reached #7 on the Finnish singles chart amongst others. Their follow-up single, "Once Upon A Time", did not chart in Germany. Pharao's second album The Return was released in the beginning of 1998, but despite the band's efforts, it did not achieve the chart success of their previous album.

According to their former management agency, Pharao disbanded in 2001.

However, in 2014, Kyra Pharao returned to front the group and tour with all of their old songs, alongside Prince Damien, who was chosen to be the new rapper of Pharao.

On 2015 a compilation album was released under the name "Best Of 1994 - 1998", all songs were digitally remastered. It wasn't released under record label, so it is only possible to get the album on special events and live concerts of the band.

In early 2016, Prince Damien left the group, and was replaced by Siam. Prince Damien later embarked on a solo career and won season 13 of Deutschland sucht den Superstar

Discography

Albums
 1994: Pharao
 1998: The Return
 2015: Best Of 1994 - 1998

Singles

References

External links
 Pharao Bio @Dance Artist Info
 Pharao Bio @Eurodance Encyclopedia
 Pharao Album Picture Gallery

German Eurodance groups
German electronic music groups
Musicians from Munich
1994 establishments in Germany
Musical groups established in 1994
2001 disestablishments in Germany
Musical groups disestablished in 2001